Liber introductorius (The Introductory Book) is the collective name for a trilogy of books written by Scottish mathematician Michael Scot in the early 13th century. The trilogy concerns the art of divination. Because the work's prologue mentions the canonization of St. Francis of Assisi, it is likely that the assemblage was officially compiled after July 16, 1228 (i.e. the date of the aforementioned canonization).

Contents 

The Liber introductorius is the collective title for the divination-centered trilogy written by Michael Scot, which takes the form of an encyclopedia dedicated to Holy Roman Emperor Frederick II. The work is made up of four parts: a prologue, and three volumes. The first volume in the trilogy is the Liber quatuor distinctionum (The Book of the Four Distinctions). The second is the Liber particularis (The Singular Book). The third and final volume is the Liber physiognomiae, which concerns physiognomy.

Footnotes

References

Bibliography 

 
  
   
 

Astrology
Academic works about philosophy